Derwent Entertainment Centre, also known as the DEC and known commercially as MyState Bank Arena, is the largest indoor arena in Tasmania and the multi-purpose arena is the primary venue in Hobart for large indoor functions/events. It was constructed in 1989 and is situated in between the waterfront of the River Derwent, the Brooker Highway and Tattersalls Park.

At maximum capacity, the DEC can accommodate 8,600 people. For sporting events, the venue can accommodate 5,500 people. On 2 July 2020, NBL Owner & Executive Chairman, Larry Kestelman, announced that the Tasmania government had been successful in its bid for a 10th NBL team. This new team will compete in the 2021/22 NBL season and will carry the Tasmania name. It will see Tasmania hosting their own NBL team for the first time in 25 years, with their home arena announced as the Derwent Entertainment Centre in Hobart.

As part of the agreement between the NBL and the Tasmanian Government, the latter will provide $68.5 million -- $20 million of which will go to a new community four court multisport facility -- for upgrades of the Derwent Entertainment Centre, the side's new home arena. In 2019, it was also the main stadium in the NBL Blitz Preseason Tournament.

History
The Derwent Entertainment Centre was built and funded in 1989 by the Bi-Centennial Project with the State Government of Tasmania. The DEC was designed by Blythe Yeung and Associates Architect (TAS) in partnership with Peter Hunt Architects of WA and was built by Hansen & Yuncken (TAS). Between 1989 and 1996, it was the home of Tasmania's former NBL team, the Hobart Devils, who moved to the larger and far more modern DEC from their previous home court, the Kingborough Sports Centre which only held 1,800. During Devils home games the DEC was often referred to as the "Devils Den" by local TV commentators. The last NBL game played at the DEC was in December 2005 when the Adelaide 36ers played the Melbourne Tigers in front of 2,416 fans.

Today the DEC still occasionally plays host to international basketball with 4,000 fans attending a game on 17 July 2006 to see the Australian Boomers defeat the New Zealand Tall Blacks 79–78. With talk of expansion in the NBL during 2014 and a possible team based in Hobart in future years, the DEC is said to be the leading candidate for any new team's home venue.

Being the largest capacity indoor venue in Tasmania, it often attracts the "big" name artists that tour the state.

It is also the home of the Music for the Masses, Australia's largest quiz night.

Other uses include clearance sales and Expos.

On 8 December 2009, a public talk, titled "Our Earth, who is responsible?", was held by the Dalai Lama.

In 2017 and 2018, the Hobart Chargers played their home games in the SEABL at the DEC.

In June 2019, it was reported that the National Basketball League were keen on purchasing the DEC from the Glenorchy City Council in order to base a Tasmanian NBL team out of a refurbished stadium.

Upon the decision to award the 10th NBL licence to the Tasmania Jack Jumpers, it was also announced that they would play their home games out of the DEC following their inception into the league for the 2021-22 NBL Season.

Naming Rights

On 9 June 2021, it was announced that Tasmanian-based MyState Bank had signed a three-year deal for the naming rights of the DEC, with the venue to be known as MyState Bank Arena.

See also
 List of indoor arenas in Australia

References

External links

National Basketball League (Australia) venues
Music venues in Australia
Indoor arenas in Australia
Sports venues in Hobart
Hobart Devils
Landmarks in Hobart
Culture in Hobart
Tourist attractions in Hobart
Sports venues completed in 1989
Glenorchy, Tasmania
Netball venues in Tasmania
Basketball venues in Australia
Tasmania JackJumpers
Basketball in Tasmania